Archer Glacier is a glacier flowing northwest into the head of Bolson Cove, Flandres Bay, on the west coast of Graham Land.

History
Archer Glacier was first charted by the Belgian Antarctic Expedition under Adrien de Gerlache, 1897–99, and named by the United Kingdom Antarctic Place-Names Committee in 1960 for Frederick Scott Archer, an English architect who in 1849 invented the wet collodion process of photography, the first practical process on glass.

See also
 List of glaciers in the Antarctic
 Glaciology

References
 

Glaciers of Danco Coast